Keith Andrews (June 15, 1920 – May 15, 1957) was an American racecar driver. He was killed after crashing his car during practice for the 1957 Indianapolis 500.

Complete AAA/USAC Championship Car results

Indianapolis 500 results

Complete Formula One World Championship results
(key)

Death
Giuseppe Farina was the only European driver on the entry list for the 1957 Indy 500, however, he did not attempt to qualify. Farina had difficulty getting his car up to speed, and had experienced handling problems. On May 15, Andrews stepped into Farina's car for a test run, but crashed. Down the frontstretch, Andrews began to slide, and when he attempted to correct, the car backed into the inside wall separating the pit area. Andrews was crushed to death between the cowl and the fuel tank, but no fire broke out. Farina withdrew after Andrews was killed, with no backup car to use.

References

1920 births
1957 deaths
Racing drivers from Denver
Indianapolis 500 drivers
AAA Championship Car drivers
World Sportscar Championship drivers
Racing drivers who died while racing
Sports deaths in Indiana

Carrera Panamericana drivers